The Smiling Fish International is an open international badminton tournament held in Thailand. It is one of the most important tournaments in Thailand behind the Thailand Open and Thailand Masters. The name of the tournament comes from that of a Thai food company from Trang, where the competition is held. The tournament is also known as the Thailand Satellite and became an International Challenge level tournament in 2016. In 2023, the tournament was renamed as Thailand International Challenge.

Winners

Performances by countries

References

1998 establishments in Thailand
Badminton
Badminton
BWF International Challenge
Recurring sporting events established in 1998
Badminton
Badminton in Bangkok
Badminton tournaments in Thailand